David Frazer Roberts (born 26 November 1949) is a Welsh retired footballer who played for Fulham, Oxford United, Hull City, and Cardiff City. During his spell at Oxford United F.C, he played 161 league games. He made 17 appearances in the Welsh national team, 6 of those while at Oxford United.

References

External links
NASL stats

1949 births
Living people
Footballers from Southampton
Wales international footballers
Wales under-23 international footballers
Fulham F.C. players
Oxford United F.C. players
Hull City A.F.C. players
Cardiff City F.C. players
Barry Town United F.C. players
English Football League players
Welsh footballers
Chicago Sting (NASL) players
North American Soccer League (1968–1984) players
Association football defenders
Welsh expatriate sportspeople in the United States
Expatriate soccer players in the United States
Welsh expatriate footballers
Expatriate footballers in Hong Kong
Welsh expatriate sportspeople in Hong Kong